Carol Creighton Burnett (born April 26, 1933) is an American actress, comedian, singer, and writer. Her groundbreaking comedy variety show The Carol Burnett Show, which originally aired on CBS, was one of the first of its kind to be hosted by a woman. She has performed on stage, television and film in varying genres including dramatic and comedic roles. She has received numerous accolades including six Primetime Emmy Awards, a Tony Award, a Grammy Award, and seven Golden Globe Awards. Burnett was awarded Presidential Medal of Freedom in 2005, the Mark Twain Prize for American Humor in 2013 and the Screen Actors Guild Life Achievement Award in 2015.

Born and raised in San Antonio, Texas, her family moved to California where she lived in the Hollywood area. She attended Hollywood High School and eventually studied theater and musical comedy at UCLA. Later she performed in nightclubs in New York City and had a breakout success on Broadway in 1959 in Once Upon a Mattress, for which she received a Tony Award nomination. She soon made her television debut, regularly appearing on The Garry Moore Show for the next three years, and won her first Emmy Award in 1962. Burnett had her television special debut in 1963 when she starred as Calamity Jane in the Dallas State Fair Musicals production of Calamity Jane on CBS. Burnett moved to Los Angeles and began an 11-year run as star of The Carol Burnett Show on CBS television from 1967 to 1978. With its vaudeville roots, The Carol Burnett Show was a variety show that combined comedy sketches with song and dance. The comedy sketches included film parodies and character pieces. Burnett created many memorable characters during the show's run, and both she and the show won numerous Emmy and Golden Globe Awards.

During and after her variety show, Burnett appeared in many television and film projects. Her film roles include Pete 'n' Tillie (1972), The Front Page (1974), The Four Seasons (1981), Annie (1982), Noises Off (1992) and Horton Hears a Who! (2008). She has a diverse television background, having appeared in other sketch shows; in dramatic roles in 6 Rms Riv Vu (1974) and Friendly Fire (1979); in various well-regarded guest roles, such as in Mad About You, for which she won an Emmy Award; and in specials with Julie Andrews, Dolly Parton, Beverly Sills, and others. She returned to the Broadway stage in 1995 in Moon Over Buffalo, for which she was again nominated for a Tony Award. In 2022, she appeared in Better Call Saul.

Burnett has written and narrated several memoirs, earning Grammy nominations for almost all of them, including a win for In Such Good Company: Eleven Years of Laughter, Mayhem, and Fun in the Sandbox. In 2019, the Golden Globes named an award after her for career achievement in television, the Carol Burnett Award, and Burnett received her first award.

Early life

Carol Creighton Burnett was born on April 26, 1933, at Nix Hospital in San Antonio, Texas, The daughter of Ina Louise (née Creighton), a publicity writer for movie studios, and Joseph Thomas Burnett, a movie theater manager. Her maternal grandparents were William Henry Creighton (1873–1918) and Mabel Eudora "Mae" Jones (1885–1967). Both of her parents were alcoholics, and at a young age she was left with her grandmother. Her parents divorced in the late 1930s. Subsequently, her parents  moved to Hollywood, and Burnett moved with her grandmother to a one-room apartment near her mother. They lived in an impoverished area of Hollywood, California, in a boarding house with Burnett's younger half-sister Chrissie.

When Burnett was in second grade, she briefly invented an imaginary twin sister named Karen, with Shirley Temple-like dimples. She later recalled that, motivated to further the pretense, she "fooled the other boarders in the rooming house where we lived by frantically switching clothes and dashing in and out of the house by the fire escape and the front door. Then I became exhausted and Karen mysteriously vanished." When Burnett was nine, she taught herself how to do the "Tarzan yell", which she realized years later was a good vocal exercise for volume, and it became a fan favorite. Burnett's first experiences with singing were with her family. Her grandmother was a trained musician who could play the piano (although they did not have one at the time), and her mother played the ukulele, so they sometimes sang popular songs in harmony together around the kitchen table. Her grandmother frequently took Burnett and her sister to the movies. They would take a few rolls of toilet paper home from the theater. The movies she saw in her youth influenced the sketch content in The Carol Burnett Show.

She worked as an usherette at the Warner Brothers Theater (now the Hollywood Pacific Theatre). When the cinema screened Alfred Hitchcock's Strangers on a Train (1951), having already seen and enjoyed the film, she advised two patrons arriving during the last five minutes of a showing to wait until the beginning of the next showing to avoid spoiling the ending for them, but the couple insisted on being seated. The manager observed Burnett not letting the couple in and fired her, stripping the epaulettes from her uniform on the spot. Years later in the 1970s after achieving TV stardom, when the Hollywood Chamber of Commerce offered her a star on the Hollywood Walk of Fame, they asked her where she wanted it. She replied "Right in front of where the old Warner Brothers Theater was, at Hollywood and Wilcox", which is where it was placed, at 6439 Hollywood Blvd.

After graduating from Hollywood High School in 1951, she received an anonymous envelope containing $50 for one year's tuition at UCLA, where she initially planned on studying journalism. During her first year of college, she switched her focus to theater arts and English, with the goal of becoming a playwright. She found she had to take an acting course to enter the playwright program. On the subject, she later reflected: "I wasn't really ready to do the acting thing, but I had no choice." During her first performance, she got a sudden impulse to speak her lines in a new way. "Don't ask me why, but when we were in front of the audience, I suddenly decided I was going to stretch out all my words and my first line came out 'I'm baaaaaaaack!'" The audience response moved her deeply:

During this time, she performed in several university productions, garnering recognition for her comedic and musical abilities. Her mother disapproved of her acting ambitions:

The young Burnett, always insecure about her looks, responded many years later to her mother's advice of "You can always write, no matter what you look like" by noting "God, that hurt!" in her memoir One More Time (1986).

During her junior year at UCLA in 1954, a professor invited Burnett and some other students to perform at a party in place of their class final that had been canceled (which required a performance in front of an audience). Afterwards, a man and his wife approached her while Burnett was stuffing cookies in her purse to take home to her grandmother. Instead of reprimanding her, the man complimented her performance and asked about her future plans. When he learned that she wanted to travel to New York in order to try her luck in musical comedy but could not afford the trip, he offered her and her boyfriend (Don Saroyan) each, on the spot, a $1,000 interest-free loan. His conditions were simply that the loans were to be repaid within five years, his name was never to be revealed, and if she achieved success, she would help other aspiring talents to pursue their artistic dreams. Burnett took him up on his offer, and she and Saroyan left college and moved to New York to pursue acting careers. That same year, her father died of causes related to his alcoholism.

Career

1950s: Early career
After spending her first year in New York working as a hat-check girl and failing to land acting jobs, Burnett, along with other girls living at the Rehearsal Club (a boarding house for women seriously pursuing acting careers), put on The Rehearsal Club Revue on March 3, 1955. They mailed invitations to agents, who showed up along with stars like Celeste Holm and Marlene Dietrich. Such attendance opened doors for several of the girls. She was cast in a minor role on The Paul Winchell and Jerry Mahoney Show in 1955. She played the girlfriend of a ventriloquist's dummy on the popular children's program. This role led to her starring role opposite Buddy Hackett in the short-lived sitcom Stanley from 1956 to 1957.

After Stanley, Burnett found herself unemployed for a short time. A few months later she bounced back, becoming highly popular as a performer on the New York circuit of cabarets and night clubs, most notably for a hit parody number called "I Made a Fool of Myself Over John Foster Dulles" (Dulles was Secretary of State at the time). In 1957, she performed this number on both The Tonight Show and The Ed Sullivan Show.  Dulles was asked about her on Meet the Press and joked, “I never discuss matters of the heart in public.”

Around this time she also worked as a regular on one of television's earliest game shows, Pantomime Quiz. In 1957, just as she was achieving her first small successes, her mother died. In October 1960, Burnett debuted at New York City's Blue Angel Supper Club, where she was discovered by scouts for The Jack Paar Show and The Ed Sullivan Show.

Burnett's first true taste of success came with her appearance on Broadway in the 1959 musical Once Upon a Mattress, for which she was nominated for a Tony Award. The same year, she became a regular player on The Garry Moore Show, a job that lasted until 1962. She won an Emmy Award that year for her "Outstanding Performance in a Variety or Musical Program or Series" on the show. She portrayed a number of characters, most memorably the put-upon cleaning woman. The character later became her signature alter-ego. With her success on the Moore Show, Burnett finally rose to headliner status and appeared in the special Julie and Carol at Carnegie Hall (1962), co-starring with her friend Julie Andrews. The show was produced by Bob Banner, directed by Joe Hamilton and written by Mike Nichols and Ken Welch. Julie and Carol at Carnegie Hall won an Emmy Award for Outstanding Program Achievement in the Field of Music, and Burnett won an Emmy for her performance. She also guest-starred on a number of shows during this time, including The Twilight Zone episode "Cavender Is Coming".

In 1964, Burnett starred in the Broadway musical Fade Out – Fade In but was forced to withdraw after sustaining a neck injury in a taxi accident. She returned to the show later but withdrew again to participate in a variety show, The Entertainers, opposite Caterina Valente and Bob Newhart. The producers of Fade Out – Fade In sued the actress for breach of contract after her absences from the popular show caused its failure, but the suit was later dropped. The Entertainers ran for only one season.

Around the same time, Burnett became good friends with Jim Nabors, who was enjoying great success with his series Gomer Pyle, U.S.M.C. As a result of their close friendship, she played a recurring role on Nabors' show as a tough corporal and later as a gunnery sergeant (starting with the episode "Corporal Carol"). Later, Nabors would be the first guest on her variety show each season, as she considered him to be her good-luck charm.

In 1959, Lucille Ball became a friend and mentor to Burnett. After having guested on Burnett's highly successful CBS-TV special Carol + 2 and having the younger performer reciprocate by appearing on The Lucy Show, it was rumored that Ball offered Burnett a chance to star on her own sitcom. In truth, Burnett was offered (but declined) Here's Agnes by CBS executives. The two women remained close friends until Ball's death in 1989. Ball sent flowers every year on Burnett's birthday. When Burnett awoke on the day of her 56th birthday in 1989, she discovered via the morning news that Ball had died. Later that afternoon, flowers arrived at Burnett's house with a note reading, "Happy Birthday, Kid. Love, Lucy."

1967–1978: The Carol Burnett Show

In 1967, CBS offered to put Burnett in a weekly comedy series called Here's Agnes. However, she had a stipulation in her ten-year contract with CBS that said she had five years from the date The Garry Moore Show ended to "push the button" on hosting thirty one-hour episodes of a music/comedy variety show. As a result, the hour-long Carol Burnett Show was born and debuted in September 1967, eventually garnering 23 Emmy Awards and winning or being nominated for multiple Emmy and Golden Globe Awards every season it was on the air. Its ensemble cast included Tim Conway (who was a guest player until the ninth season), Harvey Korman, Lyle Waggoner and the teenaged Vicki Lawrence, whom Burnett discovered and mentored. The network initially did not want her to do a variety show because it believed only men could be successful at variety, but her contract required that it give her one season of whatever kind of show she wanted to make. She chose to carry on the tradition of past variety show successes.

A true variety show, The Carol Burnett Show struck a chord with viewers. Among other subjects, it parodied films (Went with the Wind! for Gone with the Wind), television (As the Stomach Turns for the soap opera As the World Turns) and commercials. There were also frequent musical numbers. Burnett and her team struck gold with the original sketch "The Family", which eventually was spun off into the television show Mama's Family, starring Vicki Lawrence.

She opened most shows with an impromptu question-and-answer session with the audience, lasting a few minutes, during which she often demonstrated her ability to humorously ad lib. On numerous occasions, she obliged when asked to perform her trademark Tarzan yell.

She ended each show by tugging on her left ear, which was a message to her grandmother. This was done to let her know that she was doing well and that she loved her. During the show's run, her grandmother died. On an Intimate Portrait episode about Burnett, she tearfully recalled her grandmother's last moments: "She said to my husband Joe from her hospital bed 'Joe, you see that spider up there?' There was no spider, but Joe said he did anyhow. She said 'Every few minutes a big spider jumps on that little spider and they go at it like rabbits!!' And then she died. There's laughter in everything!" She continued the tradition of tugging her ear. The show ceased production in 1978. Four post-script episodes were produced and aired on ABC during the summer of 1979 under the title Carol Burnett & Company. The productions used essentially the same format and, with the exception of Harvey Korman and Lyle Waggoner, the same supporting cast. Beginning in 1977, the comedy sketches of her series were edited into half-hour episodes for syndication entitled Carol Burnett and Friends, which for many years proved to be extremely popular in syndication. In the digital age, the series began airing on MeTV in January 2015.

The show's enduring popularity surprised many when a 2001 retrospective containing outtakes and discussions with the cast, and a tribute to Bob Mackie, drew in 30 million viewers, topping the Emmy Awards as well as all but the final game of that year's World Series. Her Grammy-winning memoir In Such Good Company is about the show, and Burnett tells about how it was developed, with anecdotes about improvisations, the cast, crew, and guests.

1980s: Film roles

Burnett starred in a few films while her variety show was running, including Pete 'n' Tillie (1972). She was nominated for an Emmy in 1974 for her role in the drama 6 Rms Riv Vu. After her show ended, she assumed a number of roles that departed from comedy. She appeared in several dramatic roles, most notably in the television movie Friendly Fire. She appeared as Beatrice O'Reilly in the film Life of The Party: The Story of Beatrice, a story about a woman fighting her alcoholism. Her other film work includes Alan Alda's The Four Seasons (1981), John Huston's Annie (1982), and Peter Bogdanovich's Noises Off (1992).

Voice roles
Burnett's first voice role was in The Trumpet of the Swan in 2001. In 2008, she had her second role as an animated character in the film Horton Hears a Who! In 2012, she had another voice role as the character Hara in the US Disney-dubbed version of The Secret World of Arrietty. In 2019, she voiced a talking chair, named Chairol Burnett, in Toy Story 4.

1969–2015: Television roles
Burnett was the first celebrity to appear on the children's series Sesame Street, appearing on that series' first episode on November 10, 1969. She also made occasional returns to the stage in the 1970s and 1980s. In 1974, she appeared at the Muny Theatre in St. Louis, Missouri, in I Do! I Do! with Rock Hudson, and eleven years later, she took the supporting role of Carlotta Campion in the 1985 concert performance of Stephen Sondheim's Follies. She made frequent appearances as a panelist on the game show Password, an association she maintained until the early 1980s (in fact, Mark Goodson awarded her his Silver Password All-Stars Award for best celebrity player; she's also credited with coming up with the title Password Plus, when it was originally planned to be titled Password '79).

In the 1980s and 1990s, she made several attempts at starting a new variety program. She also appeared briefly on The Carol Burnett Show's "The Family" sketches' spinoff, Mama's Family, as her stormy character, Eunice Higgins. She played the matriarch in the cult comedy miniseries Fresno, which parodied the primetime soap opera Falcon Crest. She returned to TV in the mid-1990s as a supporting character on the sitcom Mad About You, playing Theresa Stemple, the mother of main character Jamie Buchman (Helen Hunt), for which she won another Emmy Award. In 1995, after an absence of 30 years, she was back on Broadway in Moon Over Buffalo, for which she was nominated for a Tony Award. Four years later, she appeared in the Broadway revue Putting It Together. In 2014, Burnett joined two-time Tony Award Winner, Brian Dennehy, on Broadway in A. R. Gurney's Love Letters.

Burnett had long been a fan of the soap opera All My Children and realized a dream when Agnes Nixon created the role of Verla Grubbs for her in 1983. Burnett played the long-lost daughter of Langley Wallingford (Louis Edmonds), causing trouble for her stepmother Phoebe Tyler-Wallingford (Ruth Warrick). She made occasional appearances on the soap opera in each decade thereafter. She hosted a 25th-anniversary special about the show in 1995 and made a brief cameo appearance as Verla Grubbs on the January 5, 2005, episode which celebrated the show's 35th anniversary. She reprised her role as Grubbs in September 2011 as part of the series' finale.

She also starred in television films such as Seasons of the Heart (1994). Burnett similarly returned to film in 2005 to star in a different role as Queen Aggravain in the movie version of Once Upon a Mattress. She guest-starred in season two episodes of Desperate Housewives as Bree's stepmother, Elanor Mason.

In 2009, she made a guest appearance on the Law & Order: Special Victims Unit, for which she was nominated for the Emmy Award for Outstanding Guest Actress in a Drama Series. In November 2010, she guest-starred on an episode of Glee as the mother of cheerleading coach Sue Sylvester. She appeared on the reboot of Hawaii Five-0 as Steve McGarrett's Aunt Debbie. Her appearances, traditionally on Thanksgiving-themed episodes, were featured from 2013 until the character died of cancer in the January 15, 2016, episode.

2010s–present
Aside from the occasional guest-starring role on television, Burnett has mostly stayed away from the spotlight, yet she still earns honorary awards for her groundbreaking work in comedy. For instance in 2013, she received the Mark Twain Prize for American Humor at the Kennedy Center. Those who were there to honor Burnett included her longtime friends and collaborators Julie Andrews, Vicki Lawrence and Tim Conway, as well as Tina Fey, Amy Poehler, Maya Rudolph, Rashida Jones and Martin Short.

In 2017, CBS aired The Carol Burnett Show: 50th Anniversary Special. The event featured Burnett, original cast members Vicki Lawrence and Lyle Waggoner, costume designer Bob Mackie and special guests Jim Carrey, Kristin Chenoweth, Stephen Colbert, Harry Connick Jr., Bill Hader, Jay Leno, Jane Lynch, Bernadette Peters, Maya Rudolph and Martin Short. Burnett spoke about the adversity she endured, saying "They said it was a man's game—Sid Caesar, Dean Martin, Milton Berle—because it hadn't been done. But that doesn't mean it couldn't be done."

In 2019, the Golden Globes created an award in Burnett's name, the Carol Burnett Award, for career achievement in television. Burnett was also announced as the first recipient of the award. The Hollywood Foreign Press said in a statement, "For more than 50 years, comedy trailblazer Carol Burnett has been breaking barriers while making us laugh". Steve Carell presented the award to Burnett.

In June 2022, Burnett guest starred in the second half of the sixth and final season of American drama series Better Call Saul, a spin-off, prequel, and sequel to Breaking Bad. Burnett was announced to be portraying a character named "Marion" on June 27, 2022, by AMC.

Personal life
Burnett married her college sweetheart Don Saroyan on December 15, 1955. They divorced in 1962.

On May 4, 1963, Burnett married television producer Joe Hamilton, a divorced father of eight and brother of actress Kipp Hamilton who had produced her 1962 Carnegie Hall concert. He later produced The Carol Burnett Show, among other projects. The couple had three daughters:
 Carrie Hamilton (December 5, 1963 – January 20, 2002), who died at the age of 38 from pneumonia as a complication of lung and brain cancer She was an actress and singer.
 Jody Hamilton (born January 18, 1967), a producer and actress
 Erin Hamilton (born August 14, 1968), a singer

Their marriage ended in divorce in 1984. The challenge of coping with Carrie's drug problems was mentioned as part of the reason for the separation, but the couple took the opportunity to inform other parents about handling such problems and raised money for the clinic in which Carrie was treated. In 1988, Burnett and Carrie took a trip to Moscow to help introduce the first Alcoholics Anonymous branch in the Soviet Union. Joe Hamilton died of cancer in 1991. Also in the 1980s, Burnett participated in a publicity campaign for MedicAlert, of which she is symbolically the
one-millionth member with the one-millionth bracelet.

On November 24, 2001, Burnett married Brian Miller. Miller is the principal drummer for the Hollywood Bowl Orchestra and is 23 years her junior.

Burnett has enjoyed close friendships with Lucille Ball, Beverly Sills, Jim Nabors (who became the godfather to her daughter Jody), Julie Andrews and Betty White. She is the acting mentor to Vicki Lawrence. They share a close friendship, as noted by Lawrence in a testimonial speech during her appearance at Burnett's 2013 Mark Twain Award in Washington, D.C. (recorded and broadcast on PBS Television).

In a 2003 interview with Terry Gross on Fresh Air, Burnett said that both she and her daughter Jody had corrective dental surgery. Burnett had an overbite resulting in a weak chin, and her daughter had an underbite. After consulting the oral surgeon about Jody's bite, he said he could repair hers as well, giving her more of a chin, so both of them got operations. Prior to this, Burnett had worked on the 1982 film Annie and was called back to reshoot part of a scene after having recovered from the surgery. The scene involved her character entering and exiting a closet to retrieve a necklace. She told the director John Huston that she was concerned about her chin looking different from entering the closet to exiting it, and he simply told her to "look determined". The scene is still in the film.

In keeping with her promise to the anonymous benefactor who assisted her in 1954, she has contributed to scholarship programs at UCLA and the University of Hawaii to help people in financial need.

In August 2020, Burnett and her husband petitioned to receive guardianship of Burnett's teenage grandson. Burnett is already "educational rights holder", meaning that she is the one who makes decisions about her grandson's schooling.

Honors and legacy

Burnett has received 23 Primetime Emmy Award nominations with 6 wins for her work in The Garry Moore Show, Julie and Carol at Carnegie Hall, The Carol Burnett Show and Mad About You. She also received 18 Golden Globe Award nominations, winning 7 Awards, for her work on The Carol Burnett Show. She also received 3 Tony Awards and 3 Grammy Awards nominations, winning one of each.

Burnett also received various honors including 2 Peabody Awards, a Screen Actors Guild Life Achievement Award and a Star on the Hollywood Walk of Fame. In 2003, she was honored with the Kennedy Center Honor. In 2005, she received the Presidential Medal of Freedom, awarded to her by President George W. Bush. In 2013, she received the Mark Twain Prize for American Humor. In 2019 she became the first recipient of the Carol Burnett Lifetime Achievement Award for Television, which was named in her honor.

Work

Filmography

Discography
Recording appearances as a singer.

Solo/Duet Albums:

 Carol Burnett Remembers How They Stopped The Show (1961). Label:  Decca.  LP, Digital.
 Julie and Carol At Carnegie Hall - Julie Andrews and Carol Burnett (1962).  Recording from Julie and Carol At Carnegie Hall TV special.  Label:  Columbia Masterworks. LP, CD, Digital.
 Let Me Entertain You: Carol Burnett Sings (1964).  Label:  Decca.  LP, CD, Digital.
 Carol Burnett Sings (1967).  Label:  RCA.  LP, CD, Digital.
 Here's Carol! Carol Burnett Sings (1968). Label:  Vocalion.  LP, Digital.
 Together Again For The First Time - Carol Burnett & Martha Raye (1968). Label:  Tetragrammaton Records.  LP.
 Julie And Carol At Lincoln Center - Julie Andrews and Carol Burnett (1971).  Recording from Julie and Carol At Lincoln Center TV special.  Label:  Columbia Masterworks.  LP, CD, Digital.
 Carol Burnett Featuring 'If I Could Write A Song' (1972).  Label:  Columbia.  LP, CD, Digital.
 Julie Andrews and Carol Burnett - The CBS Television Specials (2012).  Compilation of albums "Julie and Carol At Carnegie Hall" and "Julie And Carol At Lincoln Center".  Label:  Masterworks Broadway.  CD, Digital.

Other Recordings:

 Once Upon A Mattress - Original Cast Recording (1959). Label:  Kapp Records.  LP, CD, Digital.
 Three Billion Millionaires - Various Artists (1963). Label:  United Nations.  LP.
 Fade In, Fade Out - Original Broadway Cast (1964).  Label:  ABC-Paramount.  LP, CD, Digital.
 Annie - Original Motion Picture Soundtrack (1982).  Label:  Columbia.  LP, CD, Digital.
 Follies:  In Concert - Various Artists (1985).  Label:  RCA.  LP, CD, Digital.
 Sherry! The Broadway Musical - Studio Cast (2004).  Label:  Angel Records.  CD, Digital.
 Annie - The Broadway Musical 30th Anniversary Production - Various Artists (2008).  Label:  Time Life.  CD, Digital.

Bibliography
 Memoirs 

Burnett and her oldest daughter, Carrie Hamilton, co-wrote Hollywood Arms (2002), a play based on Burnett's bestselling memoir, One More Time (1986). The show was developed at the 1998 Sundance Theatre Lab and The Goodman Theatre before arriving on Broadway, directed by Harold Prince. Sara Niemietz and Donna Lynne Champlin shared the role of Helen (the character based on Burnett), while Michele Pawk played Louise, Helen's mother, and Linda Lavin played Helen's grandmother. For her performance, Pawk received the 2003 Tony Award for Best Performance by a Featured Actress in a Play. The show received a staging at New York's Merkin Concert Hall in 2015.

Burnett has written and recorded three memoirs, each voice recording receiving a nomination for Grammy Award for Best Spoken Word Album.
This Time Together (2010) 
Carrie and Me (2014)
In Such Good Company (2016)

Books

Litigation
Burnett v. National Enquirer, Inc.

In 1976, a false report in the tabloid newspaper The National Enquirer incorrectly implied that Burnett had been drunk and boisterous in public at a restaurant with U.S. Secretary of State Henry Kissinger in attendance. The fact that both of her parents suffered from alcoholism made this a particularly sensitive issue to her. Through years of persistent litigation, she won a judgment against the Enquirer in 1981. Though the initial jury award of $1.6 million was reduced to $200,000 after a series of appeals, and the final settlement was out of court, the event was widely viewed as a historic victory for libel victims of tabloid journalism.

Carol Burnett and Whacko, Inc. vs. Twentieth Century Fox Film Corporation

In 2007, Burnett and Whacko, Inc. brought a suit against 20th Century Fox demanding at least $2 million in damages after an animated likeness of Burnett appeared in the 2006 episode "Peterotica" of the animated sitcom Family Guy. In the episode, the characters discuss the cleanliness of a porn shop, with one character stating that it is so clean because Burnett works there as a janitor. Burnett is then shown as her well-known charwoman character, mopping the floor in the porn shop, while a modified version of "Carol's Theme", the theme song used in The Carol Burnett Show, plays. The characters subsequently discuss Burnett's ear tug and make a crude comment about it. The lawsuit alleged copyright infringement, violation of publicity rights and misappropriation of Burnett's name and likeness. In addition to damages, Burnett and her company demanded that Fox remove all references to her, the theme and the character. The studio refused. The court ruled in favor of the defendant because the bit was a parody, which is protected by the First Amendment, particularly by Fair Use doctrine.

References

Citations

Sources

External links

Carol Burnett  Video produced by Makers: Women Who Make America
Carol Burnett news on Topix.net
John Foster Dulles song
Carol Burnett, The Ed Sullivan Show
Interview with Carol Burnett. Accessed February 11, 2017.
Carol Burnett at The Museum of Broadcast Communications

 
1933 births
Living people
20th-century American actresses
20th-century American comedians
21st-century American actresses
Actresses from San Antonio
American women singers
American film actresses
American memoirists
American musical theatre actresses
American sketch comedians
American stage actresses
American television actresses
American voice actresses
American women comedians
Audiobook narrators
Back Stage West Garland Award recipients
Carol Burnett Award Golden Globe winners
Best Musical or Comedy Actress Golden Globe (television) winners
Grammy Award winners
Hollywood High School alumni
Kennedy Center honorees
Mark Twain Prize recipients
Peabody Award winners
Writers from San Antonio
Presidential Medal of Freedom recipients
Primetime Emmy Award winners
Special Tony Award recipients
UCLA Film School alumni